Qaleh Now-e Kalateh Menar (also Romanized as Qal‘eh Now-e Kalāteh Menār; also known as Qal‘eh Now-e Khārzār and Qal‘eh Now) is a village in Pain Velayat Rural District, Razaviyeh District, Mashhad County, Razavi Khorasan Province, Iran. At the 2006 census, its population was 99, in 26 families.

References 

Populated places in Mashhad County